Aslıhan Koruyan Sabancı, née Dilek Aslıhan Koruyan (born c. 1972), is a Turkish Celebritychef and author, who specializes in healthy and creative recipes. She represented her country as Miss Turkey at the Miss World 1991 beauty pageant.

Personal life 
Aslihan Koruyan Sabanci was born in Ankara, Turkey.
As a child, Aslihan developed an interest in cooking and was encouraged by her family to experiment with different culinary projects.
In 2002, Aslihan married Demir Sabanci.  They have three children together.

Career 
Present

Aslihan chef and author, internationally recognized for her healthy recipes designed for everyday life.  Her published works focus on a healthy, gluten free Mediterranean diet, and her upcoming books expand into other natural, nutritious recipes.

Miss World 
Aslihan won the title of Miss Turkey in 1991 and represented Turkey in the 41st Miss World Beauty Pageant on December 21,1991 in Atlanta, Georgia, finishing in the top ten semifinalist, also winning title ‘European Queen of Beauty.'

Education and early career 
In 1996, Aslihan graduated from Texas A&M University, where she studied Economics.  After university, Aslihan moved to Milan to pursue a joint MBA from Cornell University, USA and the SDA Bocconi University, Italy.
She started her career at 1998 at  Johnson & Johnson Family of Companies, Medical Devices and Diagnostics in New Jersey, USA. Between 1998–2002, she held different managerial positions at Ethicon Inc. and Ethicon Endo-Surgery Inc. in New York, New Jersey, and Istanbul.
She joined Sedes Holding in 2002 as a founding shareholder and currently serves as a Vice Chairman of the Board of Directors.

Aslihan also holds Master certificates in the Essentials of Hospitality Management, Foodservice Management, Hospitality Marketing and a Certificate in Plant Based Nutrition from Cornell University, New York, USA.

Publications 
Following her diagnosis with food sensitivity, she began to adapt the traditional Turkish recipes passed down from her grandmother and mother, as well as the international recipes that she learned in her studies, to fit within a gluten-free diet. In 2011, Aslihan published the first book of healthy, all natural gluten-free recipes in Turkey, titled Gluten Free Mediterranean Gourmet Cuisine.
Her book has been well-received from critics in Turkey, including those from Hello!, Time Out, NTV Bloomberg  and Milliyet. Her book won the Gourmand World Cookbook Award for ‘Best Health and Nutrition Book in the World at the 17th International Gourmand World Cookbook Awards, Paris March 7, 2012.

References

External links 
Basil Magazine
Cookbook review from Dawn Marcus M.D.

1970s births
Living people
People from Ankara
Turkish chefs
Turkish beauty pageant winners
Texas A&M University alumni
Turkish women in business
Turkish businesspeople
Diet food advocates
Miss World 1991 delegates
Cornell University College of Agriculture and Life Sciences alumni
Samuel Curtis Johnson Graduate School of Management alumni
Cornell University School of Hotel Administration alumni
Gluten-free cookbook writers